Mount Jackson is a mountain located in Coos County, New Hampshire. The mountain is named after Charles Thomas Jackson, New Hampshire's state geologist in the 19th century, and is part of the Presidential Range of the White Mountains.  Mount Jackson is flanked to the north by Mount Pierce, and to the southwest by Mount Webster.

The Appalachian Trail, a 2,170-mile (3,500-km) National Scenic Trail from Georgia to Maine, crosses the summit of Mount Jackson as it traverses the main ridge of the Presidentials from Crawford Notch to the summit of Mount Washington. Jackson stands on the west side of the Presidential – Dry River Wilderness.

See also

 List of mountains in New Hampshire
 White Mountain National Forest

References

External links
 "Hiking Mount Jackson". Appalachian Mountain Club.
 
  "Mount Jackson Hiking Guide". FranklinSites.com.

Mountains of New Hampshire
White Mountains (New Hampshire)
Mountains of Coös County, New Hampshire
New England Four-thousand footers
Mountains on the Appalachian Trail